Carbajal (or Carabajal) was the name of a family of Marranos in Mexico at the end of the sixteenth century and the beginning of the seventeenth, all connected with Don Luis de Carabajal y Cueva, governor of Nuevo León. Several members of the family suffered martyrdom at the stake for Judaizing. Still today the family name Carbajal belongs to families in almost all Hispanic America.

Francisca Nuñez de Carabajal
Luis de Carabajal y Cueva, sometimes called Luis de Carabajal the younger